Elisabeth Ivanovna Steinberg (1884–1963) was a Soviet botanist noted for studying the plants of North Asia, including Russia and Kazakhstan.  She worked at Tomsk State University and St. Petersburg State University. During the siege of Leningrad in the Second World War, she was among those protecting the Peterhof Natural Science Institute. 

She identified at least 30 species.

References 

1884 births
1963 deaths
Soviet botanists